Liernu is a village of Wallonia and a district of the municipality of Éghezée, located in the province of Namur, Belgium.

Liernu is best known for its centuries old Big Oak Tree, one of the largest and oldest in continental Europe. The tree took part in the "European Tree of the Year" competition in 2016 as a representative of Belgium.

References

External links
 
    An association devoted to the Oak Tree in Liernu

Former municipalities of Namur (province)